Kardeh Rural District is a rural district (dehestan) in the Central District of Mashhad County, Razavi Khorasan province, Iran. At the 2006 census, its population was 7,096, in 1,745 families.  The rural district has 16 villages.

References 

Rural Districts of Razavi Khorasan Province
Mashhad County